The Chevrolet Corvette (C8) is the eighth generation of the Corvette sports car manufactured by American automobile manufacturer Chevrolet. It is the first mid-engine Corvette since the model's introduction in 1953, differing from the traditional front-engine design. The C8 was announced in April 2019, and the coupe made its official debut on July 18, 2019 in Tustin, California. The convertible made its debut in October 2019 during a media event at the Kennedy Space Center to coincide with the 50th anniversary of the Apollo 11 mission. The racing version, the Chevrolet Corvette C8.R, also made its debut that same month. Production officially began on February 3, 2020, delayed by the 2019 General Motors strike.

Overview 
Following several experimental CERV prototype vehicles, the C8 is GM's first production mid-engine sports car since the Pontiac Fiero was discontinued. It features a vastly different design from previous Corvettes, with an all-new aluminum architecture and coil-over springs in place of leaf springs used on prior models. The exterior features more aggressive aerodynamics including larger air intakes and prominent side scoops. A trunk is located at the rear, with additional storage space at the front of the car. Combined, these provide  of cargo space,  less than that of the C7. The cockpit has been designed to be driver-centric, with numerous controls mounted on the center console as well as utilizing a new hexagonal steering wheel. A  digital screen replaces the instrument cluster and reflects one of the six driving modes selected, and is accompanied by an  touchscreen. A special Z button (a homage to Zora Arkus-Duntov "Father of the Corvette") is also mounted on the steering wheel; this can quickly activate customized performance settings.

Stingray

Trim levels and options 

Three trim levels are currently available, 1LT, 2LT and 3LT, augmented by three suspension setups, FE1, FE3 and FE4 which correspond with the two Z51 Performance packages. In addition, three seat options are also available: GT1, GT2 and Competition Sport. The interior is upholstered in leather, microsuede or performance textile with carbon fiber or aluminum trims. A Performance Data Recorder has been upgraded with a higher resolution camera as well as a new interface. GM's virtual camera mirror is optional, which projects video from the backup camera onto the rear view mirror.

Engine 

The Stingray uses a new version of the LS-based GM small-block engine derived from the C7 Stingray's LT1, now called the LT2. The engine uses dry sump lubrication system. Like the C7, the C8 features Active Fuel Management, or cylinder deactivation, which is used when the car is subjected to low load scenarios such as highway cruising.

The engine has two radiators, one on each side in the front.  The Z51 package includes a third radiator, a water-to-water and water-to-oil radiator on the rear driver's side, cooling both engine oil and transmission lubricant, taking air in through the rear quarter panel opening.

Transmission 

The Stingray is only offered with an 8-speed dual-clutch automated transmission made by Tremec, with paddle shifters on the steering wheel. No manual transmission option is available. The only other model years not offered with a manual transmission were the 1953–1954 C1 and the 1982 C3.

Suspension 
The base model of the Stingray comes with unequal length double wishbone suspension at the front and rear axles made from forged aluminum. Monotube shock absorbers are standard at all four wheels. The car can be equipped with a front-axle lifting height adjustable suspension system that can add  of ground clearance at speeds under .

The Z51 package adds a performance-tuned adjustable suspension with higher front and rear spring rates and firmer dampers. The front shocks, on vehicles without hydraulic front lift, and the rear shocks, have threaded spring seats that allow adjustment of the preload on the coil springs.  Additionally, the spring seat can be adjusted approximately  up or down from the nominal position.

Magnetic Selective Ride Control is an available option for all trims and levels.  On Z51 equipped Corvettes, Magnetic Selective Ride Control includes Performance Traction Management and electronic limited-slip differential (eLSD).

Wheels 
All-season tires are used on base models for better grip. The exact tire dimensions are 245/35ZR-19 at the front and 305/30ZR-20 at the rear.

Technology 
The C8 Corvette debuted with an 8-inch infotainment screen in a driver centric cockpit. It comes standard with Chevrolet's Infotainment 3 Plus system. Standard features include Bluetooth connectivity, 4G hotspot, and both Android Auto and Apple CarPlay. Higher trims are equipped with a 14-speaker Bose audio system and navigation options. Additional technology features include a performance data recorder package for 2LT and 3LT trim levels as well as a camera based rear view mirror. The 2020 Corvette was the first year Chevrolet introduced over the air updates to the Corvette line-up. This allows Chevrolet to send updates to the vehicle remotely. Chevrolet used this capability to resolve a front trunk recall for the 2020 Corvettes.

Right-hand-drive (RHD) 
For the first time since the 1953 introduction of the Corvette (C1), the current generation Corvette is offered in right-hand-drive configuration for the Australian, Japanese, and UK markets. The Corvette (C8) is General Motors' only RHD vehicle to be assembled in the factory rather than converted from left-hand-drive. After the pre-sale announcement, 300 RHD Corvettes were sold within sixty hours: a record for the Corvette sales in Japan and three times the annual sales number for its left-hand-drive predecessor. The introduction of RHD Corvette for Australian market has been delayed to the middle of 2021 due to the reorganization of Holden Special Vehicles (HSV) into GMSV (General Motors Special Vehicles). Only 200 RHD Corvettes will be sold in Australia per year, and the price is set at $149,990 AUD with higher performance versions above $200,000 AUD.

Z06 

The performance version of the Corvette, the Z06, was unveiled on October 26, 2021. The Z06 entered production as a 2023 model year as a homologation vehicle.

Trim levels and options 
The Z06 has three trim levels adding various interior comfort and technology upgrades: 1LZ, 2LZ, and 3LZ. Additionally, the Z07 Performance Package can be applied to any trim that adds improved brakes, carbon fiber aerodynamic elements, suspension tuning, and performance tires.

Engine 

The Z06 uses a new naturally aspirated 5.5 L V8 producing  at 8,400 rpm,  of torque at 6,300 rpm and has a redline of 8,600 rpm. This engine, dubbed the LT6, features a double overhead camshaft (DOHC) and a flat-plane crank, and surpasses the Mercedes-Benz SLS AMG Black Series' M159 engine to become the most powerful naturally aspirated production V8. A modified version of this engine has powered the Chevrolet Corvette C8.R since 2019, and many features in the racing engine carry over to the road engine. Other features of this new engine include a cast aluminum block, dual coil valve springs supporting titanium intake & sodium filled exhaust valves, forged aluminum pistons, forged titanium connecting rods, active split intake manifold with twin 87mm throttle bodies, four-into-two-into-one stainless steel exhaust headers, and a factory six-stage 10-quart dry sump oiling system with individual crank bay scavenging. A feature the LT6 shares with other Chevrolet small blocks is the bore spacing of 4.4 inches.

Transmission 
The Z06 uses the same 8-speed dual-clutch transmission used by Stingray models, albeit with a shorter 5.56:1 final drive ratio for improved acceleration.

Suspension 
The Z06 features the same basic suspension setup as the Stingray, however the electronic limited-slip differential and magnetic ride adaptive suspension system are now standard for all Z06 trims. The Z07 Performance Package includes the FE7 track-oriented suspension setup.

Wheels 
The Z06's body has been widened to accommodate larger wheels and thicker tires. The tires have dimensions of 275/30ZR20 at the front and 345/25ZR21 at the rear, and the Z07 Performance Package comes standard with Michelin Cup 2 R ZP performance tires. Chevrolet claims that the optional carbon fiber wheels, supplied by Australian manufacturer Carbon Revolution, shave off  of unsprung weight.

Aerodynamics 
The base Z06 comes with a front splitter and a rear spoiler. Under the splitter are stall gurneys to reduce drag. The Z07 carbon fiber performance package adds a larger front-splitter, front corner canards (dive planes), a pedestal mounted rear wing, and underbody aero strakes, and removes the stall gurneys under the splitter for additional downforce. Chevrolet claims that with all these equipped and in the track configuration, the Z06 is capable of 1.22g lateral acceleration on a skidpad.

Performance 
Chevrolet claims a 10.6-second quarter-mile time for the Z06 model when equipped with the Z07 package.

E-Ray 

The performance hybrid version of the Corvette, the E-Ray, was unveiled on January 17, 2023. The E-Ray will enter production as a 2024 model year and will be the quickest Corvette ever made as well as the first with all wheel drive and the first hybrid.

Trim levels and options 
The E-Ray has three trim levels adding various interior comfort and technology upgrades: 1LZ, 2LZ, and 3LZ. Additionally, there will be a ZER Performance Package that can be applied to any trim and It will include summer only tires as well as chassis tuning. The E-Ray will come standard with Carbon Ceramic brakes and an eAWD drivetrain.

Performance 
Chevrolet claims a 10.5-second quarter-mile time and a 0-60 time of 2.5 seconds making it the quickest Corvette to date in those categories.

Modes 
Stealth Mode allows for all-electric driving at a maximum speed of 45 mph. Designed for quietly leaving the neighborhood.

Model year changes

2020 model year 
The first production model of the C8 Corvette was the Stingray with a new mid-mounted 6.2 L LT2 V8 engine. It was available as a 2-door targa top or a retractable hardtop convertible. The targa top was available in body color, transparent, or visible carbon fiber.

2021 model year

Trim levels and options 
2021 saw a list of changes following the 2020 launch year of the C8 Corvette. Long Beach Red Metallic Tintcoat and Blade Silver Metallic were retired. Red Mist Metallic Tintcoat and Silver Flare Metallic were added as premium color options. Additionally, full length racing stripes saw 4 new color options.

The interior saw the addition of Sky Cool Gray / Strike Yellow color available only on the 3LT. Magnetic Ride became available separate to the Z51 package for the 2021 model year. The Z51 package saw a price increase from $5,000 to $5,995 starting 2021. The front lift saw an increase from $1,495 to $1,995 as well.

Wireless Apple CarPlay and Android Auto became standard options in 2021. Black Trident Spoke wheels, all weather floor liners, and carbon fiber mirror covers all saw minor price increases as well.

The 2021 C8 received a base price increase, mid way through the production cycle. Chevrolet raised the base price by $1000, putting it over the $60,000 threshold. The price increase was effective for all orders entered after March 1, 2021. The increase was attributed to a fluctuation in supplier parts costs as well as the global chip shortage which has delayed production in the automotive sector as a whole.

The end of the 2021 production year also saw the end of Sebring Orange, Shadow Gray, and Zeus Bronze as exterior color options.

Production 
The 2021 Corvette started production on December 8, 2020, due to extended production of the 2020 model year. The 2021 model year saw production issues due to parts constraints. Chevrolet also increased the base price of the Corvette by $1,000 in the middle of the 2021 model year, to $60,995.

2022 model year 
The LT2 saw fuel management system upgrades for the 2022 model year which featured a new fuel pump and injectors. The base price was also increased $1200 to compensate for increased supplier costs. A new IMSA GTLM Championship Edition package, limited to 1000 units, was introduced for 2022.

The 2022 model year saw the introduction of Caffeine Metallic, Amplify Orange Tintcoat, and Hypersonic Gray as new color options.

2023 model year 
GM and Chevrolet started production of the 2023 model year in the spring of 2022. 2023 saw multiple price increases early into the production year. In March, it was announced that the 2023 model year would see a $1000 base price increase. In May, the destination charge saw a minor $100 increase. During the start of production and launch of the 2023 configurator, GM raised the base price of the 2023 Corvette by $2300 making the new base price $65,595. Several packages and options saw increases and adjustment to pricing.  

2023 also received a special edition variation of the Corvette to commemorate its 70th anniversary since the launch of the Corvette model. The 2023 Corvette Stingray 70th Anniversary Edition is a $5995 package atop the 3LT trim level. The special edition was offered in two exclusive colors of White Pearl Metallic Tri-Coat and Carbon Flash Metallic. Additionally, the package came with special wheels, badging, and VIN sequence to commemorate the vehicle's 70th year in the US market.  

In addition to changes to the base Corvette, the Corvette Z06 was introduced with a 5.5 L LT6 V8 engine.

Production

Awards 
The Corvette C8 was named 2020 Motor Trend Car of the Year, and was also featured on 2020 Car and Driver 10Best. The C8 was also named 2020 North American Car of the Year, 2020 Detroit Free Press Car of the Year, and 2020 MotorWeek Drivers' Choice Best of the Year.

References

External links 

 

Cars introduced in 2019
Chevrolet Corvette
Rear mid-engine, rear-wheel-drive vehicles
Rear mid-engine, all-wheel-drive vehicles
Flagship vehicles
Hybrid electric cars